Tina and Bobby is a British television series based on the relationship between footballer Bobby Moore and Tina Moore. The three-part series was first broadcast on 13 January 2017 on ITV.

Premise
The series follows the life of Tina Dean and her husband, West Ham United footballer, Bobby Moore.

Cast
 Lorne MacFadyen as Bobby Moore:
A young footballer who believes that football is his life. His life changes when he meets local girl, Tina Dean, and they start a life together.

 Michelle Keegan as Tina Dean:
An ordinary local girl who falls for West Ham United footballer, Bobby Moore.
 Patsy Kensit as Betty Dean, Tina's mother.
 Sophie Austin as Judith Hurst, wife of Geoff Hurst.

Production
Tina is played by Michelle Keegan with Moore played by Lorne MacFadyen. The series covers the Moores' involvement with the 1966 World Cup, the Bogotá Bracelet incident and the 1970 World Cup.

Episodes

References

External links

Bobby Moore
2010s British drama television series
2017 British television series debuts
2017 British television series endings
ITV television dramas
2010s British television miniseries
Television shows set in London
Television series by ITV Studios
English-language television shows
Cultural depictions of Bobby Moore